Urostrophus vautieri, the Brazilian steppe iguana, is a species of lizard in the family Leiosauridae. The species is endemic to Brazil.

References

Urostrophus
Reptiles of Brazil
Reptiles described in 1837
Taxa named by André Marie Constant Duméril
Taxa named by Gabriel Bibron